Márcio Borges (born on 20 January 1973 in Rio de Janeiro) is a Brazilian former professional footballer who played as a defender. He started his career playing for the Botafogo youth team. In Europe he played for Swiss side Yverdon-Sport and German clubs Waldhof Mannheim and Arminia Bielefeld. He retired in September 2007.

References

External links
 
 

1973 births
Living people
Botafogo de Futebol e Regatas players
Yverdon-Sport FC players
SV Waldhof Mannheim players
Arminia Bielefeld players
Association football defenders
Bundesliga players
2. Bundesliga players
Brazilian expatriate footballers
Brazilian expatriate sportspeople in Germany
Expatriate footballers in Germany
Brazilian expatriate sportspeople in Switzerland
Expatriate footballers in Switzerland
Footballers from Rio de Janeiro (city)
Brazilian footballers